Elections to North Lanarkshire Council were held on 1 May 2003, the same day as the other Scottish local government elections and the Scottish Parliament general election.

Election results

Total number of valid votes cast: 111,847.

Ward results

External links
North Lanarkshire Council

2003
2003 Scottish local elections